
NVC community H4 (Ulex gallii - Agrostis curtisii heath) is one of the heath communities in the British National Vegetation Classification system. It is one of three communities which are considered transitional between the lowland dry heaths and the wetter communities classified in the NVC as mires.

It is a relatively localised community. There are four subcommunities.

Community composition

The following constant species are found in this community:
 Bristle Bent (Agrostis curtisii)
 Heather (Calluna vulgaris)
 Bell Heather (Erica cinerea)
 Cross-leaved Heath (Erica tetralix)
 Purple Moor-grass (Molinia caerulea)
 Tormentil (Potentilla erecta)
 Western Gorse (Ulex gallii)

The following rare species are associated with the community:
 Bristle Bent (Agrostis curtisii)
 Soft-leaved Sedge (Carex montana)
 Dorset Heath (Erica ciliaris)
 Cornish Heath (Erica vagans)

Distribution

This community is confined to southwest England, from Dorset and Somerset westwards, and the southern coastal region of Wales.

Subcommunities

There are four subcommunities:
 the Agrostis curtisii - Erica cinerea subcommunity
 the Festuca ovina subcommunity
 the Erica tetralix subcommunity
 the Scirpus cespitosus subcommunity

References

 Rodwell, J. S. (1991) British Plant Communities Volume 2 - Mires and heaths  (hardback),  (paperback)

H04